Maximilian Joseph von Tarnóczy (Hungarian: Tarnózy Miksa) (24 October 1806 – 4 April 1876) was an Austrian Cardinal and Archbishop.

He was born in Schwaz on 24 October 1806, the son of Franz Xaver von Tarnóczy (Tarnóczy Ferenc), a Hungarian-Bavarian nobleman (1756–1837) and his second wife, Catherine von Sprinzenberg (1776–1837). He studied in Innsbruck and Salzburg and in 1829 became a priest. In 1832 he received a doctorate in theology and worked as a teacher at the Salzburg Lyceum.

In 1850 he was appointed Archbishop of Salzburg, a position he held until his death in 1876.

As Archbishop of Salzburg, Tarnóczy wielded huge power in Rome, so much so that when he arrived at the First Vatican Council, Pope Pius IX welcomed him with the words, "Ecco il mezzo papa, che puo far dei vescovi" ("See the demi-Pope, who can make Bishops"). The Archbishop of Salzburg had the power to ordain and consecrate the Bishop of Gurk; a power Tarnóczy exercised when he consecrated Prince-Bishop Valentin Wiery in 1858.

Pope Pius IX elevated Tarnóczy to the rank of Cardinal the consistory of 22 December 1873 and appointed him Cardinal-Priest of Santa Maria in Aracoeli.

He died on 4 April 1876 at age 69.

References

1806 births
1876 deaths
People from Schwaz
Roman Catholic archbishops of Salzburg
19th-century Austrian cardinals
Cardinals created by Pope Pius IX